Free space may refer to:
 A perfect vacuum, that is, a space free of all matter
 In electrical engineering, free space means air (as opposed to a material, transmission line, fiber-optic cable, etc.):
Free-space optical communication is communication by shining light through air
Free-space path loss, the spreading-out of light as it travels through 3D space
Free-space display is a 3D display projected into the air, often with the help of mist
 Autonomous free space, community centers in which non-authoritarians enact principles of mutual aid
 Social centre the free shared space in a community
 Descent: FreeSpace – The Great War, a space combat simulation computer game
 The area of a data storage device (for example, a computer disk drive) that is still available for more data storage
 , the subset of a configuration space where a robot will not collide with obstacles

See also
 Deep Space (disambiguation)